Anailis Dorvigni (born 8 October 1991) is a Cuban judoka who won a bronze medal at the 2016 Pan American Judo Championships.

Medals

References

External links
 

Living people
1991 births
Cuban female judoka
Pan American Games medalists in judo
Pan American Games bronze medalists for Cuba
Medalists at the 2019 Pan American Games
Judoka at the 2019 Pan American Games
20th-century Cuban women
20th-century Cuban people
21st-century Cuban women